Harry Stewart Fleetwood Andrews, CBE (10 November 1911 – 6 March 1989) was an English actor known for his film portrayals of tough military officers. His performance as Regimental Sergeant Major Wilson in The Hill (1965) alongside Sean Connery earned Andrews the National Board of Review Award for Best Supporting Actor and a nomination for the 1966 BAFTA Award for Best British Actor. The first of his more than 80 film appearances was in The Red Beret in 1953.

Prior to his film career, Andrews was a theatre actor, appearing at such venues as the Queen's Theatre, the Lyceum Theatre, and the Shakespeare Memorial Theatre in the UK as well as theatres in New York City, Paris, Antwerp and Brussels. Andrews made his London theatre debut in 1935 at the St James's Theatre and his New York debut in 1936 at the Empire Theatre.

He was awarded the Commander of the Order of the British Empire (CBE) in 1966.

Early life 
Harry Andrews was born on 10 November 1911, in Tonbridge, Kent. He was the son of Henry Arthur Andrews, a General Practitioner, and Amy Diana Frances (née Horner). Andrews attended Yardley Court school in Tonbridge, and Wrekin College in Wellington, Shropshire.

Acting

Theatre
Andrews made his first stage appearance in September 1933 at the Liverpool Playhouse playing John in The Long Christmas Dinner. He made his London debut in March 1935 at the St James's Theatre playing the role of John in Worse Things Happen at Sea. In March 1936, he featured in a cast including Paul Robeson, Orlando Martins and Robert Adams in a staging of Toussaint Louverture: The Story of the Only Successful Slave Revolt in History, a play by C. L. R. James, at the Westminster Theatre in London. In October 1936, Andrews made his first appearance in New York playing the role of Horatio in Hamlet at the Empire Theatre. From September 1937 to April 1938, Andrews worked with John Gielgud's company at the Queen's Theatre, appearing in such shows as Richard II, The School for Scandal and The Merchant of Venice. In 1939, Andrews assumed the role of Laertes in a production of Hamlet at the Lyceum Theatre. This was the final production at the Lyceum before it closed, though it was restored in 1996. He joined up in October 1939 and was commissioned into the Royal West Kent Regiment from 162 OCTU (The Honourable Artillery Company) on 21 September 1940 with the number 149267. In August 1942 he transferred to the Royal Artillery serving in Europe during the D-Day Landings and on the advance into Germany. On 4 April 1946, Andrews was Mentioned in Despatches “for gallant and distinguished service in North West Europe.”  He was demobilised with the rank of Major.

In December 1945, Andrews appeared with the Old Vic company at what was then referred to as the New Theatre, succeeding George Curzon in the parts of Sir Walter Blunt in Henry IV, Part 1, Scroop in Henry IV, Part 2, Creon in Oedipus and Sneer in The Critic. The company toured to New York City in the summer of 1946, appearing at such venues as the Century Theatre. Upon returning to Britain in September 1946, Andrews continued performing with the Old Vic company through the end of the 1948–1949 season.

In 1949, Andrews joined the company at the Shakespeare Memorial Theatre in Stratford-upon-Avon, in which he performed in such Shakespearean roles as Macduff, Don Pedro and Cardinal Wolsey. Andrews toured with the company through Australia in 1949. He continued to perform with the company in Stratford-upon-Avon through the 1951 season, playing Henry IV through three consecutive Shakespeare plays. He then travelled to New York with the company of Laurence Olivier, performing in such plays as Caesar and Cleopatra and Antony and Cleopatra at the Ziegfeld Theatre. Andrews went on tour with the Old Vic company performing Henry VIII in Paris, Antwerp and Brussels.

In 1971 Harry Andrews played the title role in Lear by Edward Bond at the Royal Court Theatre, London, continuing his association with contemporary British theatre with his role in the film adaptation of Entertaining Mr Sloane by Joe Orton of the previous year in 1970 to great critical praise.

Film

Andrews made his first two screen appearances with Alan Ladd in the films The Red Beret (1953) and The Black Knight (1954). He performed in several historical and adventure films, including Alexander the Great and Moby Dick (both 1956), Ice Cold in Alex (1958), Solomon and Sheba (1959) and 633 Squadron (1964). In the 1960s and 1970s, Andrews began performing more frequently in dramas and comedy films. He received the award for Best Supporting Actor from the National Board of Review of Motion Pictures for his performances in The Agony and the Ecstasy (1965) as Donato Bramante. The film starred Charlton Heston with whom Andrews shared several scenes in 55 Days at Peking (1963) and The Hill (1965) alongside Sean Connery. His performance in The Hill also resulted in Andrews being nominated for the 1966 BAFTA award for Best British Actor, though the award was won by Dirk Bogarde for his performance in Darling. Andrews later appeared in such films as the comedy The Jokers (1967), the musical comedy The Night They Raided Minsky's (1968), the 1970 film adaptation of Emily Brontë's novel Wuthering Heights, 1970 film adaptation of 1964 Joe Orton play, the comedy The Ruling Class (1972), Man of La Mancha (1972) as the Innkeeper, the horror film Theatre of Blood (1973), and the 1976 film adaptation of Maurice Maeterlinck's play The Blue Bird, which was the first film collaboration between the United States and Soviet Russia. In 1978 he portrayed Norris the butler in Michael Winner's version of Raymond Chandler's The Big Sleep starring Robert Mitchum as Philip Marlowe.

Andrews was known for his portrayal of tough military officers. These performances included Sergeant Payne in A Hill in Korea (1956), Major Henry in I Accuse! (1958), Major Swindon in the 1959 film adaptation of George Bernard Shaw's play The Devil's Disciple, Captain Graham in A Touch of Larceny (also 1959), the 3rd Earl of Lucan in The Charge of the Light Brigade (1968) and Colonel Thompson in Too Late the Hero in 1970, and Grand Duke Nicholas, commander of the Russian army, in Nicholas and Alexandra in 1971.

In addition to film work, Harry Andrews also appeared in several television series. In the early 1960s, Andrews appeared in two episodes of Armchair Theatre. He portrayed Colonel Bruce in Edward the Seventh (1975) and Darius Clayhanger in a 1976 television series based on The Clayhanger Family novels. He played one of the Kryptonian elders during the sentencing of the three villains in the film Superman (1978). He played the Prime-Minister, Lord Bellinger, in the 1986 adaptation of Sherlock Holmes' The Second Stain. In 1985, Andrews was interviewed on an episode of This Is Your Life.

Filmography

 The Red Beret (1953) as R.S.M. Cameron
 The Black Knight (1954) as Earl Of Yeonil
 The Man Who Loved Redheads (1955) as Williams
 Helen of Troy (1956) as Hector
 Alexander the Great (1956) as Darius
 Moby Dick (1956) as Stubb
 A Hill in Korea (1956) as Sgt. Payne
 Saint Joan (1957) as John de Stogumber
 I Accuse! (1958) as Maj. Henry
 Ice Cold in Alex (1958) as M.S.M. Pugh
 The Devil's Disciple (1959) as Maj. Swindom
 Solomon and Sheba (1959) as Baltor
 A Touch of Larceny (1959) as Capt. Graham
 In the Nick (1960) as Chief Officer Williams
 A Circle of Deception (1960) as Capt. Thomas Rawson
 The Best of Enemies (1961) as Capt. Rootes
 Barabbas (1961) as Peter
 Reach for Glory (1962) as Capt. Curlew
 The Inspector (1962) as Ayoob
 Nine Hours to Rama (1963) as Gen. Singh
 55 Days at Peking (1963) as Father de Bearn
 The Informers (1963) as Supt. Alec Bestwick
 Nothing But the Best (1964) as Mr. Horton
 633 Squadron (1964) as Air Vice Marshal Davis
 The System (1964) as Larsey
 The Truth About Spring (1965) as Sellers
 The Hill (1965) as Regimental Sergeant Major Wilson
 The Agony and the Ecstasy (1965) as Donato Bramante
 Sands of the Kalahari (1965) as Grimmelman
 Modesty Blaise (1966) as Sir Gerald Tarrant
 The Deadly Affair (1967) as Inspector Mendel
 The Night of the Generals (1967) as Gen. Stulpnagel (uncredited)
 The Jokers (1967) as Insp. Marryatt
 The Long Duel (1967) as Stafford
 Danger Route (1967) as Canning
 I'll Never Forget What's'isname (1967) as Gerald Sater
 A Dandy in Aspic (1968) as Fraser
 The Charge of the Light Brigade (1968) as Lord Lucan
 The Night They Raided Minsky's (1968) as Jacob Schpitendavel
 The Sea Gull (1968) as Sorin, her brother
 Play Dirty (1968) as Brig. Blore
 The Southern Star (1969) as Kramer
 Battle of Britain (1969) as Churchill's Military Envoy
 Destiny of a Spy (1969 TV movie) as Gen. Kirk
 A Nice Girl Like Me (1969) as Savage, Caretaker
 Country Dance (1970) as Brig. Crieff
 Too Late the Hero (1970) as Col. Thompson
 Entertaining Mr Sloane (1970) as Ed
 Wuthering Heights (1970) as Mr. Earnshaw
 The Nightcomers (1971) as Master of the House
 Nicholas and Alexandra (1971) as Grand Duke Nicholas (Nikolasha)
 Burke & Hare (1971) as Dr. Knox
 I Want What I Want (1972) as Roy's Father
 The Ruling Class (1972) as Ralph Gurney – 13th Earl of Gurney
 Night Hair Child (1972) as Headmaster
 Man of La Mancha (1972) as The Innkeeper / The Governor
 Man at the Top (1973) as Lord Clive Ackerman
 Theatre of Blood (1973) as Trevor Dickman
 The Mackintosh Man (1973) as Mackintosh
 The Final Programme (1973) as John
 The Story of Jacob and Joseph (1974) as Isaac
 The Internecine Project (1974) as Albert Parsons
 Valley Forge (1975 TV movie) as Gen. William Howe
 The New Spartans (1975) 
 Sky Riders (1976) as Auerbach
 The Blue Bird (1976) as Oak
 The Passover Plot (1976) as Yohanan the Baptist
 The Garth People (1976) 
 The Prince and the Pauper (1977) as Hertford
 Equus (1977) as Harry Dalton
 The Four Feathers (1978 TV movie) as Gen. William Feversham
 The Big Sleep (1978) as Norris
 The Medusa Touch (1978) as Assistant Commissioner
 Death on the Nile (1978) as Barnstaple
 Watership Down (1978) as Gen. Woundwort (voice)
 Superman (1978) as 2nd Elder
 S.O.S. Titanic (1979 TV movie) as Capt. Edward J. Smith
 A Question of Faith (1979) as Leo Tolstoy
 The Curse of King Tut's Tomb (1980 TV movie) as Lord George Carnarvon
 Closing Ranks (1980 TV movie) as Sir James Croft
 Hawk the Slayer (1980) as High Abbot
 Never Never Land (1980)
 Tales of the Unexpected  (1980 TV episode "The Sound Machine")  as Klausner
 Seven Dials Mystery (1981 TV movie) as Superintendent Battle
 My Letter to George (1985) as Old Thompson
 The Return of Sherlock Holmes (1986 TV series, episode "The Second Stain") as Lord Bellinger
 Jack the Ripper (1988 TV movie) as The Coroner
 Cause célèbre (1989 TV movie) as Francis Rattenbury

Personal life

Andrews' partner for more than 30 years, until his death, was fellow actor Basil Hoskins, who survived him until 2005 but next to whom he is now buried at St Mary the Virgin, Salehurst, East Sussex. The two men had worked together on the film Ice Cold in Alex. Andrews died at the age of 77 on 6 March 1989, at his home in Salehurst.

Between 1956 and 1961, Andrews lived at Little Thatch, Belgrave Road, Seaford, East Sussex.

References

External links 
 
 
 

1911 births
1989 deaths
20th-century English male actors
20th-century English musicians
20th-century English LGBT people
British Army personnel of World War II
Commanders of the Order of the British Empire
English gay actors
English gay musicians
English male film actors
English male television actors
English male voice actors
English LGBT actors
English LGBT musicians
Male actors from Kent
Musicians from Kent
People educated at Wrekin College
People from Salehurst
People from Tonbridge
Queen's Own Royal West Kent Regiment officers
Royal Artillery officers